Otis Gowa (born 3 September 1985) is an indigenous Australian sprinter raised in Queensland.

Gowa won the Australian national 100 m sprint title in a time of 10.63 seconds.  His time was just outside his personal best time of 10.54 seconds, achieved in Singapore during 2007.  He also competed in the 2008 Stawell Gift finishing fourth.

Achievements

References

External links
IAAF Biography

1985 births
Living people
Australian male sprinters
People from Queensland